Syfanoidea is a monotypic moth genus of the family Noctuidae. Its only species, Syfanoidea schencki, is found in South Africa. Both the genus and species were first described by Max Bartel in 1903.

References

Endemic moths of South Africa
Agaristinae
Monotypic moth genera